Peo is the English version of the French-language surname Peillot. It may refer to:

People with the surname Peo
Sheeva Peo (born 1976), Olympic weightlifting competitor
Ralph Peo (1897–1966), American inventor and industrialist

Places
Reckong Peo, the capital of Kinnaur district in India

See also
PEO (disambiguation)